Stanislav Yurievich Sadalsky (born 8 August 1951 in Chuvashia) is a Soviet and Russian actor.

Selected filmography
 The Twelve Chairs (Двенадцать стульев, 1971) as Fireman in the theater "Columbus"
 The Meeting Place Cannot Be Changed (Место встречи изменить нельзя, 1979) as Kostya "Kirpich" Saprykin, pickpocket
 Say a Word for the Poor Hussar (1981) as cornet Alexei Pletnev
 Station for Two (Вокзал для двоих, 1982) as man with a carburetor
 White Dew (Белые Росы, 1983) as Mikhail Kisel
 Confrontation (Противостояние, 1985) as Gennady Zipkin, taxi driver
 The Lady with the parrot (Дама с попугаем, 1988) as Gennady Fedorov
 Presumption of Innocence (Презумпция невиновности, 1988) as Leonid Borisovich Ozeran
 Two arrows. Stone Age Detective (Две стрелы. Детектив каменного века, 1989) as Eloquent
 Promised Heaven (Небеса обетованные, 1991) as photographer at the wedding
 Act, Manya! (Действуй, Маня!, 1991) as Vasya
 Na kogo Bog poschlet (На кого Бог пошлет, 1994) as Pavel Hlyuzdin
 Deadly Force (Убойная сила, 2000, 2003) as Anatoly Lvovich
 My Fair Nanny (Моя прекрасная няня, 2004) as Probkin

References

External links
 

1951 births
Living people
Russian male actors
Soviet male actors
Russian Academy of Theatre Arts alumni
Russian television presenters
Soviet male voice actors
Russian male voice actors
Russian radio personalities
People's Artists of Georgia
Russian bloggers
People from Batyrevsky District
Honored Artists of the RSFSR
Male bloggers